Elizabeth Bowen CBE (7 June 1899 – 22 February 1973) was an Irish-British novelist and short story writer notable for her books about the "big house" of Irish landed Protestants as well her fiction about life in wartime London.

Life
Elizabeth Dorothea Cole Bowen was born on 7 June 1899 at 15 Herbert Place in Dublin, daughter of barrister Henry Charles Cole Bowen (1862–1930), who succeeded his father as head of their Irish gentry family traced back to the late 1500s, of Welsh origin, and Florence Isabella Pomeroy (died 1912), daughter of Henry FitzGeorge Pomeroy Colley, of Mount Temple, Clontarf, Dublin, grandson of the 4th Viscount Harberton. Florence Bowen's mother was granddaughter of the 4th Viscount Powerscourt. Elizabeth Bowen was baptised in the nearby St Stephen's Church on Upper Mount Street. Her parents later brought her to her father's family home, Bowen's Court at Farahy, near Kildorrery, County Cork, where she spent her summers. When her father became mentally ill in 1907, she and her mother moved to England, eventually settling in Hythe. After her mother died in September 1912 Bowen was brought up by her aunts; her father remarried in 1918. She was educated at Downe House School under the headship of Olive Willis. After some time at art school in London she decided that her talent lay in writing. She mixed with the Bloomsbury Group, becoming good friends with Rose Macaulay who helped her seek out a publisher for her first book, a collection of short stories entitled Encounters (1923).

In 1923 she married Alan Cameron, an educational administrator who subsequently worked for the BBC. The marriage has been described as "a sexless but contented union." The marriage was reportedly never consummated. She had various extra-marital relationships, including one with Charles Ritchie, a Canadian diplomat seven years her junior, which lasted over thirty years. She also had an affair with the Irish writer Seán Ó Faoláin and a relationship with the American poet May Sarton. Bowen and her husband first lived near Oxford, where they socialised with Maurice Bowra, John Buchan and Susan Buchan, and where she wrote her early novels, including The Last September (1929). Following the publication of To the North (1932) they moved to 2 Clarence Terrace, Regent's Park, London, where she wrote The House in Paris (1935) and The Death of the Heart (1938). In 1937, she became a member of the Irish Academy of Letters.

In 1930 Bowen became the first (and only) woman to inherit Bowen's Court, but remained based in England, making frequent visits to Ireland. During World War II she worked for the British Ministry of Information, reporting on Irish opinion, particularly on the issue of neutrality. Bowen's political views tended towards Burkean conservatism. During and after the war she wrote among the greatest expressions of life in wartime London, The Demon Lover and Other Stories (1945) and The Heat of the Day (1948); she was awarded the CBE the same year.

Her husband retired in 1952 and they settled in Bowen's Court, where he died a few months later. Many writers visited her at Bowen's Court from 1930 onwards, including Virginia Woolf, Eudora Welty, Carson McCullers, Iris Murdoch, and the historian Veronica Wedgwood. For years Bowen struggled to keep the house going, lecturing in the United States to earn money. In 1957 her portrait was painted at Bowen's Court by her friend, painter Patrick Hennessy. She travelled to Italy in 1958 to research and prepare A Time in Rome (1960), but by the following year Bowen was forced to sell her beloved Bowen's Court, which was demolished in 1960. In the following months, she wrote for CBS the narrative of the documentary titled Ireland the Tear and the Smile which was realised in collaboration with Bob Monks as camera man and associate 
producer. After spending some years without a permanent home, Bowen finally settled at "Carbery", Church Hill, Hythe, in 1965.

Her final novel, Eva Trout, or Changing Scenes (1968), won the James Tait Black Memorial Prize in 1969 and was shortlisted for the Booker Prize in 1970. Subsequently, she was a judge (alongside her friend Cyril Connolly) that awarded the 1972 Man Booker Prize to John Berger for G. She spent Christmas 1972 at Kinsale, County Cork, with her friends, Major Stephen Vernon and his wife, Lady Ursula (daughter of the Duke of Westminster) but was hospitalised upon her return. Here she was visited by Connolly, Lady Ursula Vernon, Isaiah Berlin, Rosamund Lehmann, and her literary agent, Spencer Curtis Brown, among others.

In 1972 Bowen developed lung cancer. She died in University College Hospital on 22 February 1973, aged 73. She is buried with her husband in St Colman's churchyard in Farahy, close to the gates of Bowen's Court, where there is a memorial plaque to the author (which bears the words of John Sparrow) at the entrance to St Colman's Church, where a commemoration of her life is held annually.

Legacy
In 1977, Victoria Glendinning published the first biography of Elizabeth Bowen. In 2009, Glendinning published a book about the relationship between Charles Ritchie and Bowen, based on his diaries and her letters to him. In 2012, English Heritage marked Bowen's Regent's Park home at Clarence Terrace with a blue plaque. A blue plaque was unveiled 19 October 2014 to mark Bowen's residence at the Coach House, The Croft, Headington, from 1925 to 1935.

Themes
Bowen was greatly interested in "life with the lid on and what happens when the lid comes off", in the innocence of orderly life, and in the eventual, irrepressible forces that transform experience. Bowen also examined the betrayal and secrets that lie beneath a veneer of respectability. The style of her works is highly wrought and owes much to literary modernism. She was an admirer of film and influenced by the filmmaking techniques of her day. The locations in which Bowen's works are set often bear heavily on the psychology of the characters and on the plots. Bowen's war novel The Heat of the Day (1948) is considered one of the quintessential depictions of London’s atmosphere during the bombing raids of World War II.

She was also a notable writer of ghost stories. Supernatural fiction writer Robert Aickman considered Elizabeth Bowen to be "the most distinguished living practitioner" of ghost stories. He included her tale 'The Demon Lover' in his anthology The Second Fontana Book of Great Ghost Stories.

Selected works

Novels
The Hotel (1927)
The Last September (1929)
Friends and Relations (1931)
To the North (1932)
The House in Paris (1935)
The Death of the Heart (1938)
The Heat of the Day (1949)
A World of Love (1955)
The Little Girls (1964)
Eva Trout (1968)

Short story collections
	Encounters (1923)
	Ann Lee's and Other Stories (1926)
	Joining Charles and Other Stories (1929)
	The Cat Jumps and Other Stories (1934)
	Look at All Those Roses (1941)
	The Demon Lover and Other Stories (1945)
	Ivy Gripped the Steps and Other Stories (1946, USA)
	Stories by Elizabeth Bowen (1959)
	A Day in the Dark and Other Stories (1965)
       The Good Tiger (1965, children's book) - illustrated by M. Nebel (1965 edition) and Quentin Blake (1970 edition)
	Elizabeth Bowen’s Irish Stories (1978)
	The Collected Stories of Elizabeth Bowen (1980)
       The Bazaar and Other Stories (2008) - edited by Allan Hepburn

Nonfiction
	Bowen's Court (1942, 1964)
	Seven Winters: Memories of a Dublin Childhood (1942)
	English Novelists (1942)
	Anthony Trollope: A New Judgement (1946)
	Why Do I Write?: An Exchange of Views between Elizabeth Bowen, Graham Greene and V.S. Pritchett (1948)
	Collected Impressions (1950)
	The Shelbourne (1951)
	A Time in Rome (1960)
	Afterthought: Pieces About Writing (1962)
	Pictures and Conversations (1975), edited by Spencer Curtis Brown
	The Mulberry Tree: Writings of Elizabeth Bowen (1999), edited by Hermione Lee
       "Notes on Éire": Espionage Reports to Winston Churchill by Elizabeth Bowen, 1940–1942 (2008), edited by Jack Lane and Brendan Clifford
	People, Places, Things: Essays by Elizabeth Bowen (2008) - edited by Allan Hepburn
	Love's Civil War: Elizabeth Bowen and Charles Ritchie: Letters and Diaries, 1941–1973 (2009), edited by Victoria Glendinning and Judith Robertson
	Listening In: Broadcasts, Speeches, and Interviews by Elizabeth Bowen (2010), edited by Allan Hepburn
       Elizabeth Bowen's Selected Irish Writings (2011), edited by Éibhear Walshe
       The Weight of a World of Feeling: Reviews and Essays by Elizabeth Bowen (2016), edited by Allan Hepburn

Critical studies of Bowen
	Jocelyn Brooke: Elizabeth Bowen (1952)
       William Heath: Elizabeth Bowen: An Introduction to Her Novels (1961)
	Edwin J. Kenney: Elizabeth Bowen (1975)
	Victoria Glendinning: Elizabeth Bowen: Portrait of a Writer (1977)
	Hermione Lee: Elizabeth Bowen: An Estimation (1981)
	Patricia Craig: Elizabeth Bowen (1986)
	Harold Bloom (editor): Elizabeth Bowen (1987)
       Allan E. Austin: Elizabeth Bowen  (1989)
	Phyllis Lassner: Elizabeth Bowen (1990)
	Phyllis Lassner: Elizabeth Bowen: A Study of the Short Fiction (1991)
	Heather Bryant Jordan: How Will the Heart Endure?: Elizabeth Bowen and the Landscape of War (1992)
	Andrew Bennett and Nicholas Royle: Elizabeth Bowen and the Dissolution of the Novel: Still Lives (1994)
	Renée C. Hoogland: Elizabeth Bowen: A Reputation in Writing (1994)
	John Halperin: Eminent Georgians: The Lives of King George V, Elizabeth Bowen, St. John Philby, and Lady Astor (1995)
	Éibhear Walshe (editor): Elizabeth Bowen Remembered: The Farahy Addresses (1998)
       John D. Coates: Social Discontinuity in the Novels of Elizabeth Bowen: The Conservative Quest (1998)
	Lis Christensen: Elizabeth Bowen: The Later Fiction (2001)
       Maud Ellmann: Elizabeth Bowen: The Shadow Across the Page (2003)
	Neil Corcoran: Elizabeth Bowen: The Enforced Return (2004)
	Éibhear Walshe (editor): Elizabeth Bowen: Visions and Revisions (2008)
	Susan Osborn (editor): Elizabeth Bowen: New Critical Perspectives (2009)
	Lara Feigel: The Love-charm of Bombs Restless Lives in the Second World War (2013)
	Jessica Gildersleeve: Elizabeth Bowen and the Writing of Trauma: The Ethics of Survival (2014)
	Nels Pearson: Irish Cosmopolitanism: Location and Dislocation in James Joyce, Elizabeth Bowen, and Samuel Beckett (2015)
       Jessica Gildersleeve and Patricia Juliana Smith (editors): Elizabeth Bowen: Theory, Thought and Things (2019)

Critical essays on Bowen
	The Bellman (Seán Ó Faoláin): "Meet Elizabeth Bowen" in The Bell Vol. 4 (September 1942)
       David Daiches: "The Novels of Elizabeth Bowen" in The English Journal Vol. 38, No. 6 (1949)
       Elizabeth Hardwick: "Elizabeth Bowen’s Fiction" in Partisan Review Vol. 16 (1949)
       Bruce Harkness: "The Fiction of Elizabeth Bowen" in The English Journal Vol. 44, No. 9 (1955)
       Gary T. Davenport: "Elizabeth Bowen and the Big House" in Southern Humanities Review Vol. 8 (1974)
       Martha McGowan: "The Enclosed Garden in Elizabeth Bowen’s A World of Love" in Éire-Ireland Vol. 16, Issue 1 (Spring 1981)
       Seán Ó Faoláin: "A Reading and Remembrance of Elizabeth Bowen" in London Review of Books (4–17 March 1982)
       Antoinette Quinn: "Elizabeth Bowen’s Irish Stories: 1939-45" in Studies in Anglo-Irish Literature (1982)
       Harriet S. Chessman: "Women and Language in the Fiction of Elizabeth Bowen" in Twentieth Century Literature Vol. 29, No. 1 (1983)
       Brad Hooper: "Elizabeth Bowen’s 'The Happy Autumn Fields': A Dream or Not?" in Studies in Short Fiction Vol. 21 (1984)
       Margaret Scanlan: "Rumors of War: Elizabeth Bowen’s The Last September and J. G. Farrell’s Troubles" in Éire-Ireland Vol. 20, Issue 2 (Summer 1985)
       Phyllis Lassner: "The Past is a Burning Pattern: Elizabeth Bowen’s The Last September" in Éire-Ireland Vol. 21, Issue 1 (Spring 1986)
       John Coates: "Elizabeth Bowen’s The Last September: The Loss of the Past and the Modern Consciousness" in Durham University Journal, Vol. LXXXII, No. 2 (1990)
       Roy F. Foster: "The Irishness of Elizabeth Bowen" in Paddy & Mr Punch: Connections in Irish and English History (1993)
       John Halperin: "The Good Tiger: Elizabeth Bowen" in Eminent Georgians: The Lives of King George V, Elizabeth Bowen, St. John Philby, and Nancy Astor (1995)
       Julian Moynahan: "Elizabeth Bowen" in Anglo-Irish: The Literary Imagination in a Hyphenated Culture (Princeton University Press, 1995)
       Declan Kiberd: "Elizabeth Bowen: The Dandy in Revolt" in Éibhear Walshe: Sex, Nation and Dissent in Irish Writing (1997)
       Carmen Concilio: "Things that Do Speak in Elizabeth Bowen’s The Last September" in Moments of Moment: Aspects of the Literary Epiphany edited by Wim Tigges (1999)
       Neil Corcoran: "Discovery of a Lack: History and Ellipsis in Elizabeth Bowen’s The Last September" in Irish University Review Vol. 31, No. 2 (2001)
       Elizabeth Cullingford: "'Something Else': Gendering Onliness in Elizabeth Bowen's Early Fiction" in MFS Modern Fiction Studies Vol. 53, No. 2 (2007)
       Elizabeth C. Inglesby: "'Expressive Objects': Elizabeth Bowen's Narrative Materializes" in MFS Modern Fiction Studies Vol. 53, No. 2 (2007)
       Brook Miller: "The Impersonal Personal: Value, Voice, and Agency in Elizabeth Bowen's Literary and Social Criticism" in Modern Fiction Studies, Vol. 53, No. 2 (Summer 2007)
       Sinéad Mooney: "Unstable Compounds: Bowen's Beckettian Affinities" in Modern Fiction Studies, Vol. 53, No. 2 (Summer 2007)
       Victoria Stewart: "'That Eternal Now': Memory and Subjectivity in Elizabeth Bowen's Seven Winters" in MFS Modern Fiction Studies Vol. 53, No. 2 (2007)
       Keri Walsh: "Elizabeth Bowen, Surrealist" in Éire-Ireland Vol. 42, No. 3-4 (2007)
       Heather Bryant Jordan: "A Bequest of Her Own: The Reinvention of Elizabeth Bowen" in New Hibernia Review Vol. 12, No. 2 (2008)
       Céline Magot: "Elizabeth Bowen’s London in The Heat of the Day: An Impression of the City in the Territory of War" in Literary London (2008)
       Éibhear Walshe: "No abiding city."  The Dublin Review No. 36 (2009)
       Jessica Gildersleeve: "An Unnameable Thing: Spectral Shadows in Elizabeth Bowen’s The Hotel and The Last September" in Perforations
       John D. Coates: "The Misfortunes of Eva Trout" in Essays in Criticism 48.1 (1998)
       Karen Schaller: "'I know it to be synthetic but it affects me strongly': 'Dead Mabelle' and Bowen's Emotion Pictures" in Textual Practice 27.1 (2013)
       Patricia J. Smith: "'Everything to Dread from the Dispossessed': Changing Scenes and the End of the Modernist Heroine in Elizabeth Bowen's Eva Trout" in Hecate 35.1/2 (2009)
       James F. Wurtz: "Elizabeth Bowen, Modernism, and the Spectre of Anglo-Ireland" in Estudios Irlandeses No. 5 (2010)
       Patrick W. Moran: "Elizabeth Bowen's Toys and the Imperatives of Play" in Éire-Ireland Vol. 46, Issue 1&2 (Spring/Summer 2011)
       Kathryn Johnson:"'Phantasmagoric Hinterlands': Adolescence and Anglo-Ireland in Elizabeth Bowen’s The House in Paris and The Death of the Heart" in Irish Women Writers: New Critical Perspectives, ed. Elke d’Hoker, et al. (2011)
       Tina O’Toole: "Unregenerate Spirits: The Counter-Cultural Experiments of George Egerton and Elizabeth Bowen" in Irish Women Writers: New Critical Perspectives, ed. Elke d’Hoker, et al. (2011)
 Lauren Elkin: "Light's Language: Sensation and Subjectivity in Elizabeth Bowen's Early Novels." Réfléchir (sur) la sensation, ed. Marina Poisson (2014)
 Gerry Smyth, "A Spy in the House of Love: Elizabeth Bowen's The Heat of the Day (1949)" in The Judas Kiss: Treason and Betrayal in Six Modern Irish Novels (Manchester: Manchester University Press, 2015), 115-34

Television and film adaptations
	The House in Paris (BBC, 1959) starring Pamela Brown, Trader Faulkner, Clare Austin and Vivienne Bennett
       The Death of the Heart (1987) starring Patricia Hodge, Nigel Havers, Robert Hardy, Phyllis Calvert, Wendy Hiller and Miranda Richardson
       The Heat of the Day (Granada Television, 1989) starring Patricia Hodge, Michael Gambon, Michael York, Peggy Ashcroft and Imelda Staunton
       The Last September (1999) starring Maggie Smith, Michael Gambon, Fiona Shaw, Jane Birkin, Lambert Wilson, David Tennant, Richard Roxburgh and Keeley Hawes

References

External links 

 1956 recording: Elizabeth Bowen discusses the importance of character to novels (Video, 11 mins)
 Elizabeth Bowen at Irish Writers Online –   
 
 Elizabeth Bowen Collection at the Harry Ransom Center, University of Texas at Austin
 Elizabeth Bowen in Encyclopædia Britannica
 Patrick Hennessy's Portrait of Elizabeth Bowen at Bowen's Court (1957) at Crawford Municipal Art Gallery, Cork, Ireland – 
 Blue plaque to Elizabeth Bowen in Headington, Oxford 
 "Notes on Writing a Novel" at Narrative Magazine – essay by Bowen
 
 
 Elizabeth Bowen at the Internet Speculative Fiction Database
 

1899 births
1973 deaths
20th-century Anglo-Irish people
Bisexual women
Bisexual novelists
British LGBT novelists
Irish LGBT novelists
Writers from Dublin (city)
People from Hythe, Kent
People educated at Downe House School
Irish Anglicans
Commanders of the Order of the British Empire
Deaths from lung cancer in England
Ghost story writers
James Tait Black Memorial Prize recipients
20th-century British women writers
Irish women novelists
20th-century Irish novelists
Irish women short story writers
20th-century Irish short story writers
British women novelists
20th-century British novelists
British short story writers
British women short story writers
20th-century British short story writers
British horror writers
Irish horror writers
People with speech impediment
Women horror writers
20th-century LGBT people